Toy Story of TERROR! is an American computer-animated Halloween television special produced by Pixar Animation Studios and Disney Television Animation and released by Walt Disney Pictures, based on the Toy Story franchise. It is set after the events of Toy Story 3, and premiered on the American television network ABC on October 16, 2013. It was written and directed by Angus MacLane, produced by Galyn Susman, with  Joan Cusack, Tom Hanks, Tim Allen, Don Rickles, Wallace Shawn, Timothy Dalton, and Kristen Schaal reprising their roles of Jessie, Woody, Buzz Lightyear, Mr. Potato Head, Rex, Mr. Pricklepants, and Trixie with Carl Weathers as Combat Carl and Stephen Tobolowsky as the motel manager. Michael Giacchino composed the music for the special. The film's soundtrack was released on October 15, 2013, on Amazon.com and iTunes in digital format.

The special follows the toys on a road trip, when a flat tire leads Bonnie and her mother to spend the night in a roadside motel. After Mr. Potato Head goes missing, the others begin to search for him, but they find themselves caught up in a mysterious sequence of events that leads them to a big conspiracy.

Plot
Bonnie and her mother are on a road trip to visit Bonnie's grandmother; Bonnie has brought Woody, Buzz Lightyear, Jessie, Rex, Mr. Pricklepants, Mr. Potato Head, and Trixie with her. In the trunk of the vehicle, the toys are watching a horror film on a portable DVD player. When the car gets a flat tire, Bonnie and her mother must spend the night at the Sleep Well roadside motel, as a tow truck cannot be sent out until the next morning.

Once Bonnie and her mother are asleep, her toys exit Bonnie's bag to explore the motel room, but Mr. Potato Head goes missing. At this point, Mr. Pricklepants begins to narrate ongoing events as if it were part of an actual horror film, considering himself an expert. The toys search through the motel for Mr. Potato Head, but several are taken by an iguana named Mr. Jones, leaving only Jessie. In a bathroom, Jessie meets an action figure named Combat Carl, who was separated from his owner, Billy. Combat Carl urges Jessie to flee to her owner for safety, but she insists on trying to rescue her friends. The iguana returns to take Combat Carl, then Jessie. The iguana is revealed to be owned by the motel's manager, Ron, who has trained Mr. Jones to steal unattended toys and other items from motel guests so he can sell them in online auctions. Ron puts Jessie in the back room of his office, in a glass cabinet containing her friends, Combat Carl, and other stolen toys.

As morning approaches, a buyer purchases Woody online and Ron packs him into a box. Jessie is sold soon after, but Ron is distracted by the arrival of the tow truck and Jessie is left on the counter. A delivery lady takes Woody's box out to her truck, and Combat Carl tells Jessie that their only hope to rescue Woody and escape is for Jessie to travel to the truck in a box. Terrified, Jessie insists that she cannot enter a box, but Combat Carl helps her gain confidence. Once inside the truck, she frees herself and Woody. They return to the office, where Bonnie and her mother are checking out. Mr. Jones attacks Jessie, but Mr. Potato Head's hand manages to open a curtain, revealing the stolen toys to Bonnie and her mother, who threatens to turn Ron over to the police. Bonnie retrieves her toys, and the trip is resumed.

During the credits, Combat Carl boards the delivery truck with the remaining toys in hopes of returning to their owner, Billy. Two police officers later arrive to interrogate Ron, who attempts to escape by hijacking their police car, but is forced to flee on foot after immediately crashing it into the motel sign; the officers initiate a manhunt for him.

Cast

 Joan Cusack as Jessie
 Carl Weathers as Combat Carl and Combat Carl Jr.
 Stephen Tobolowsky as Ronald the Motel Manager
 Tom Hanks as Woody
 Tim Allen as Buzz Lightyear
 Timothy Dalton as Pricklepants
 Wallace Shawn as Rex
 Kristen Schaal as Trixie
 Don Rickles as Potato Head
 Kate McKinnon as PEZ Cat 
 Lori Alan as Bonnie's Mom
 Peter Sohn as Transitron 
 Emily Hahn as Bonnie
 Dawnn Lewis as Delivery Lady 
 Jason Topolski as Vampire and Tow Truck Guy
 Ken Marino as Pocketeer 
 Christian Roman as Old Timer
 Laraine Newman as Betsy
 Angus MacLane as Officer Wilson
 Josh Cooley as Officer Phillips
 Dee Bradley Baker as Mr. Jones
 Tara Strong as the Computer Voice

Soundtrack

The film's score was composed by Michael Giacchino. The soundtrack was released by Walt Disney Records on October 15, 2013.

 Track listing

Release

Reception 
The special has received critical acclaim. The review aggregator website Rotten Tomatoes reported that 94% of critics have given the special a positive review based on 16 reviews, with an average rating of 8.04/10. At Metacritic, the special has a weighted average score of 80 out of 100 based on 7 critics, indicating "generally favorable reviews". Matt Roush of TV Guide said, "ABC's Toy Story of Terror! is a delightful half-hour vignette of gags, action and self-empowerment, couching its never-give-up message in terrific non-stop entertainment." Brian Lowry of Variety said, "Toy Story of Terror! is about a quarter the length of the average animated feature, but everything else here could easily be mistaken for the bigscreen version, from the pacing and humor to Michael Giacchino's score." Rob Owen of Pittsburgh Post-Gazette said, "It's a small adventure befitting the 30-minute running time but it's also clever in the way it ultimately puts the "Toy Story" characters in a recognizable situation, which is similar to the big-screen movies." Neil Genzlinger of The New York Times said, "Once the annual avalanche of Halloween-themed episodes, specials and movies overtakes TV, you probably don't expect to be using the word 'charming' very often. But charming perfectly describes one such entry, Toy Story of Terror!" Emily VanDerWerff of The A.V. Club said, "The Toy Story franchise has always operated best with a note of existential panic, and there's some of that here, but it feels like the special leans awfully hard on the films that gave rise to it." Robert Lloyd of Los Angeles Times said, "Themes from earlier Toy Story movies are also recycled, which should bother no one. Although Woody and Buzz get their screen time–with Jessie, they are the 'Jules et Jim' of computer-animated cartoons about sentient playthings—it is the plucky cowgirl, facing her fears, whose story this is."

Home media
Toy Story of Terror! was released on Blu-ray and DVD on August 19, 2014. It includes the three Toy Story Toons shorts: Hawaiian Vacation, Small Fry, and Partysaurus Rex. On October 23, 2020, the special made a surprise release onto Disney+.

References

External links

  at Disney
  at Pixar
 

2013 television specials
2010s American animated films
American Broadcasting Company television specials
American television films
Annie Award winners
2010s animated short films
2013 computer-animated films
Disney television specials
Films directed by Angus MacLane
Films scored by Michael Giacchino
Halloween television specials
Toy Story
2010s American television specials
2010s animated television specials
2013 short films
2013 films